German submarine U-154 was a Type IXC U-boat of Nazi Germany's Kriegsmarine built for service during World War II. The keel for this boat was laid down on 21 September 1940 at the DeSchiMAG AG Weser yard in Bremen, Germany as yard number 996. She was launched on 21 April 1941 and commissioned on 2 August under the command of Korvettenkapitän Walther Kölle.

The submarine began her service life with training as part of the 4th U-boat Flotilla; moving on to the 2nd flotilla for operations. She conducted eight patrols, sinking ten ships.

Although it was believed to be sunk by the Colombian Destroyer ARC Caldas during a short encounter near San Andrés Island in 1944, the U-154 escaped without damage. Using spare oil and some damaged torpedo tubes, the Germans were able to fake the oil slick and wreckage.

Design
German Type IXC submarines were slightly larger than the original Type IXBs. U-154 had a displacement of  when at the surface and  while submerged. She had two shafts and two  propellers.

U-154 was fitted with six  torpedo tubes (four fitted at the bow and two at the stern), 22 torpedoes, one  SK C/32 naval gun, 180 rounds, and a  SK C/30 as well as a  C/30 anti-aircraft gun. The boat had a complement of forty-eight.

Service history

First patrol
The boat's first patrol began with her departure from Kiel on 7 February 1942. She headed for the Atlantic Ocean west of Ireland via the gap between the Faroe and Shetland Islands. She docked at Lorient in occupied France, on 1 March.

Second patrol
Her success continued with the sinking of Catahoula, Delvalle, Empire Amethyst and Vineland, all near Haiti and the Dominican Republic.

Third, fourth and fifth patrols
Her third patrol saw her cross the Atlantic once more.

One of the boat's victims on this, her fourth patrol, was Nurmahal.

Having made the short trip from Lorient to Brest, the submarine's fifth foray was her longest (109 days) and second most successful. Amongst many others, she attacked Florida. Although the ship had her back broken on 28 May 1943, she was eventually repaired.

Sixth, seventh and eighth patrols and loss
She departed on patrol number six on 2 October 1943. U-154 was attacked by an unidentified PBY Catalina flying boat on 3 November; she was also twice attacked on the 22nd. None caused any damage. The boat returned to Lorient on 20 December.

U-154 was also engaged on 29 March by the Colombian Navy destroyer . She returned to France, again to Lorient, on 28 April 1944.

Wolfpacks
U-154 took part in one wolfpack, namely:
 Südwärts (24 – 26 October 1942)

Postscript
Kusch had removed Hitlers portrait from the boat and had repeatedly called him an idiot and described the Nazis as tapeworms. Ironically Ulrich Abel, who subsequently gained his own command on U-193 was killed before Kusch's murder, when U-193 was sunk in April 1944 on its first patrol under his command. Druschel was killed when U-154 was sunk on 3 July 1944. It was not until the 1990s that Kusch's legal record was wiped clean and a memorial to his memory was erected, Oskar-Kusch-Strasse, a street in Kiel, Germany is named after him.

Summary of raiding history

References

Bibliography

External links
 
 

German Type IX submarines
U-boats commissioned in 1941
U-boats sunk in 1944
World War II submarines of Germany
1941 ships
Ships built in Bremen (state)
U-boats sunk by depth charges
U-boats sunk by US warships
Ships lost with all hands
Maritime incidents in July 1944